The Ukrainian Canadian Students’ Union, commonly known by its Ukrainian acronym, SUSK, in all three languages, is a national student organization composed of Ukrainian Students Organizations (USOs) at post-secondary institutions across Canada.

SUSK is a national member of the Ukrainian Canadian Congress.

History 
Formed in 1953 in Winnipeg, Manitoba, SUSK was active in Canadian post-secondary institutions for five decades before falling inactive in 2002. It was revived at the XXII Congress of Ukrainian Canadians held in Winnipeg, in October 2007.

In November 2008, SUSK coordinated two projects with USOs across Canada in remembrance of the Holodomor: a 33-hour fast to raise awareness on campuses, and a display called “Holodomor: Genocide by Famine”.

In 2011, SUSK held a contest to win a spot on the Historical Train of Ukrainian Pioneers to commemorate the 120th anniversary of the first Ukrainians immigrating to Canada.

In March 2012, SUSK celebrated Ukrainian Literature Day to commemorate the Ukrainian poet, Taras Shevchenko. 

In 2018, SUSK partnered with the Ukrainian World Congress to participate in its Postcards for Prisoners project.

During the month of May 2021, SUSK launched a National Campaign titled "Russian Aggression Awareness Month" to raise awareness about the ongoing Russian invasion in Ukraine, and has expanded its activism since the 2022 Russian invasion of Ukraine.

SUSK Congress 
SUSK hosts its Congress at different locations each year. The first Congress was held in Winnipeg, Manitoba in 1953. Since 2007, the Congress has been held annually, with the 2020 and 2021 events being hosted online. The most recent Congress was held in Edmonton, Alberta in 2022.

Student 
Student or Студент is the official publication of SUSK.

Notable alumni

 Arthur McDonald
 , Board of Directors President from 1982 to 1984
 Paul M. Grod, Board of Directors member from 1994 to 1997 (President from 1994 to 1995)
 Donald Sadoway, Board of Directors member from 1972 to 1974

See also 

 List of Canadian students' associations
 Ukrainian Canadian Congress

References

External links 
Official website
Archives of early SUSK Congresses

Student organizations in Canada
Ukrainian-Canadian culture
Student organizations established in 1953
Students' associations in Canada
Ukrainian diaspora organizations
Diaspora organizations in Canada
Ukrainian-Canadian culture in Manitoba